Guntersville City School District is a school district in Marshall County, Alabama.

Superintendent
The current Superintendent is Dr. Jason Barnett, who took office on June 9, 2021.

References

External links
 

Education in Marshall County, Alabama